Kazumi Kawai (可愛 かずみ Kawai Kazumi) (July 9, 1964 – May 9, 1997 in Tokyo, Japan), was a Japanese actress. She committed suicide by jumping from an apartment building on May 9, 1997.

Filmography
Hatsukoi Scandal (1986 TV special)

References

External links
可愛かずみ博物館（ファンサイト）
可愛かずみ同盟（ファンサイト）

1964 births
1997 deaths
Suicides by jumping in Japan
Singers from Tokyo
20th-century Japanese actresses
Japanese gravure idols
20th-century Japanese women singers
20th-century Japanese singers
1997 suicides